Malacoctenus zonifer, the glossy blenny, is a species of labrisomid blenny native to the Pacific coast of Mexico from the south of the Gulf of California to Oaxaca.  This species can reach a length of  TL.

References

zonifer
Fish of Mexican Pacific coast
Fish described in 1882
Taxa named by David Starr Jordan